Lata Usendi was is a Indian politician who was Women and Child Development Minister of Chhattisgarh. She was elected to state assembly from Kondagaon constituency as a candidate of BJP]].

References

Living people
Women members of the Chhattisgarh Legislative Assembly
People from Kondagaon district
Bharatiya Janata Party politicians from Chhattisgarh
Chhattisgarh MLAs 2013–2018
Year of birth missing (living people)
21st-century Indian women politicians